Izora may be,

Izora language, Nigeria
Izora Armstead, singer
Izora Fair, Confederate spy